"How Stands the Glass Around", also referred to as "General Wolfe's Song", is an English folk song. The lyrics express the suffering of soldiers, wherefore the song was primarily popular among people serving in the military. It deals with the helplessness experienced during war and the boldness demanded in the military, but also about reducing fear and pain by consuming alcohol. One paper suggests that it was the favourite song of Alexander Hamilton.

Background 
The oldest known reference to the song is an alternative text written for a ballad opera in the year 1729. It became notorious after Wolfe was reported to have sung it before the Battle of the Plains of Abraham (1759), gaining thereby the alternative title of "General Wolfe's Song".

Lyrics

Melody

Further use 
 The composer William Shield made use of the song for his opera Siege of Gibraltar (1780).
 The sonata  Siege of Quebec by William de Krifft begins with the melody of How Stands the Glass Around.
 The band Wilderun conceived a metal arrangement of How Stands the Glass Around.

Trivia 
 Alexander Graydon quotes the song in his memoirs.

Recordings

Sources 

18th-century songs
Drinking songs
Songs about the military
English-language literature
Seven Years' War
American Revolutionary War